De Mûnts (English: The Monk) is a smock mill in Buitenpost, Friesland, Netherlands which has been restored to working order. The mill is listed as a Rijksmonument, number 7039.

History

This mill was built in 1870 at Oosterhoogebrug, Groningen, where it drained the Borgsloterpolder in connection with the construction of the Eemskanal. It was demolished in 1952. In 1958, millwright A de Roos of Leeuwarden started to rebuild the mill at Buitenpost for Wolter O Bakker of Harkstede. This was completed in 1959. Repairs and restoration were carried out in 1963 and 1973. In 1985, the inner sailstock, which was made of wood, broke. It was replaced by an iron one by millwright Buurma of Oudeschans, Groningen. In 1990, the outer sailstock was also replaced with an iron on by Buurma. Further restoration work was carried out on the mill in 1994.

Description

De Mûnts is a smock mill winded by a winch. There is no stage, the sails reaching almost to the ground. The mill has a single-storey brick base and a three-storey smock. The smock and cap are thatched. The windshaft also carries the brake wheel, which has 37 cogs. This drives the wallower (19 cogs) at the top of the upright shaft. At the bottom of the upright shaft, the crown wheel (28 cogs) drives the wooden Archimedes' screw via a gear wheel with 29 cogs. The Archimedes' screw has an axle diameter of 210 millimetres (8¼ in) and is  diameter overall. It is inclined at an angle of 15°. Each revolution of the screw lifts  of water.

Public access

De Mûnts is open to the public when the mill is working, or by appointment.

References

Achtkarspelen
Windmills in Friesland
Windmills completed in 1959
Smock mills in the Netherlands
Rijksmonuments in Friesland
Octagonal buildings in the Netherlands